The Viña del Mar psychopaths were Chilean serial killer duo Jorge José Sagredo Pizarro (22 August 1955 – 29 January 1985) and Carlos Alberto Topp Collins (25 January 1950 – 29 January 1985), both ex-members of the Carabineros, the local Chilean police forces. They committed ten murders and four rapes from 5 August 1980 to 1 November 1981, in the city of Viña del Mar. When they were caught on 8 March 1982, it was revealed that they had only been dishonored from the Carabineros forces days prior, on 4 March 1982.

They were the last men to be legally executed in Chile before the practice was outlawed in 2001.

History

Crimes 

Enrique Gajardo Casales, killed on 5 August 1980 on the El Olivar trail, close to the intersection with the Achupallas pass.
 Alfredo Sánchez Muñoz, killed on 12 November 1980 in the Estadio Sausalito sector; during the attack, they also raped Sánchez's companion, Fernanda Bohle Basso.
 Fernando Lagunas Alfaro and Delia González Apablaza, both killed on 28 February 1981 on the Marga Marga estuary.
 Luis Morales Álvarez, killed on 25 May 1981 on the Camino Granadilla. They also stole Álvarez's taxi.
 Jorge Inostroza Letelier, killed on 26 May 1981 in Reñaca; during the attack, they also raped Inostroza's companion Margarita Santibáñez Ibaceta.
 Raúl Aedo León, killed on 28 July 1981 in the National Botanical Garden of Viña del Mar. They also stole León's taxi.
 Oscar Noguera Inostroza, killed on 28 July 1981 in Limache; during the attack, they also raped Noguera's companion Ana María Riveros Contreras.
 Jaime Ventura Córdova and Rosana Venegas Reyes, killed on 1 November 1981 under the Capuchinos Bridge.

Investigation
There were two parallel investigations during the crime series. One was conducted by the OS7 Department of the Carabineros, which covers Drugs and Narcotics, directed by Mayot Ávila. The other was by a special group of the Investigations Police of Chile (PDI), directed by Commissioner Nelson Lillo.

The key to finding the two murderers was delivered by Corporal Juan Quijada, of the First Commissariat of Viña del Mar, who realized that witnesses described the two men as speaking in an authoritative voice, often used by Chilean policemen. After Sagredo confessed to the crimes, Corporal Quijada denounced him to the OS7 Drug Department.

Detention and judicial process
Sagredo and Topp Collins were brought to justice on 8 March 1982, and declared guilty by the Minister in visit Dinorah Cameratti on 13 March.

Jorge Sagredo and Carlos Topp Collins confessed extrajudicially, judicially and publicly to all their crimes. In this way, both were found guilty and sentenced to death, a sentenced first handed down on 8 January 1983 by the minister in visit Julio Torres Allú.

The sentence was confirmed in the second instance by the unanimity of the First Chamber of the Court of Appeals of Valparaíso, composed of the ministers Margarita Osnovikoff, Iris González and Guillermo Navas. The sentence was ratified unanimously by the Third Chamber of the Supreme Court of Chile, consisting of the ministers Osvaldo Erbetta Vaccaro, Emilio Ulloa Muñoz, Abraham Meersohn Schijman and the lawyers Raúl Rencoret Donoso and Cecilli Cáceres, on 17 January 1985.

Execution
Relatives of the victims lobbied against the executions of Sagredo and Topp since they believed the two men were connected to a higher-ranking death squad. Sagredo said he and Topp had committed some of the murders after being given drugs and promised money by a "crime club" that included a prominent building contractor and five other "executives" who wanted to eliminate political opponents of the Pinochet regime. Only one "executive" was identified Luis Gubler Diaz, a building contractor and member of a prominent Vina del Mar family. Diaz had close ties with intelligence squads during the violent repression of leftists after the 1973 coup.

An investigation showed that a revolver owned by Gubler was used in four murders. The detective told a court that Gubler confessed to two murders while in custody. However, the detective and the judge hearing the case were later removed. Gubler was freed, and a new judge refused to permit any new evidence against him on the grounds that his confession was made under torture.

However, both men were denied presidential clemencies by Augusto Pinochet, and they were executed by firing in Quillota on 29 January 1985, as was common at the time. Their hands were tied, they were strapped to chairs, and they had circular red paper targets placed over their hearts.

Sagredo and Topp were the last people to be legally executed in Chile, as the country abolished capital punishment for common offenses in 2001.

Cultural references 
 During 2013 and 2014, Canal 13 issued a series called Secretos en el Jardín, inspired by the case.
 The movie Pena de Muerte, released in 2012, retells the story of this case and how it impacted the Chilean population.

See also
List of serial killers by country
The Jackal of Nahueltoro, another notable instance of the death penalty being used in Chile

References

1980 murders in Chile
1981 murders in Chile
1985 deaths
1980s murders in Chile
20th-century executions by Chile
Carabineros de Chile
Chilean people convicted of murder
Criminal duos
Executed Chilean serial killers
Male serial killers
People convicted of murder by Chile
People executed by Chile by firearm
People executed for murder
People from Viña del Mar